Amir Farid is an American-born Iranian-Australian classical pianist and chamber musician based in Melbourne. He is also the pianist member of Benaud Trio as well as the principal accompanist for the senior performing ensemble of the Australian Children's Choir.

Amir Farid was born in Palo Alto, California. He is the son of the celebrated Iranian theatre and film artist Manouchehr Farid (منوچهر فرید). Following the Iranian Revolution of 1979, Manoucher Farid left Iran for the United States. Later the family emigrated to Australia.

Amir Farid studied with Professor Ronald Farren-Price at University of Melbourne, from 1995 until 2004 when he graduated with Honours. Between 2003 and 2005 he attended the Australian National Academy of Music, where he worked with Geoffrey Tozer, Rita Reichman and Timothy Young.

In 2006 he won the first prize of the Australian National Piano Award. In 2007 he was given the Encouragement Award at the 2007 Lev Vlassenko Piano Competition.  In the same year he won the Geoffrey Parsons Award, the only competition in Australia that focuses entirely on the art of piano accompaniment.

Farid then undertook postgraduate studies in London at the Royal College of Music with Andrew Ball. He graduated in 2009 with distinction, as a scholar supported by the Gordon Calway Stone Memorial Award.

He is married to the oboist Annabelle Farid.

Awards and nominations

AIR Awards
The Australian Independent Record Awards (commonly known informally as AIR Awards) is an annual awards night to recognise, promote and celebrate the success of Australia's Independent Music sector.

|-
| AIR Awards of 2013
|Hymne à l’amour 
| Best Independent Classical Album
| 
|-
| AIR Awards of 2015
|Amir Farid Plays Javad Maroufi: Golden Dreams and Other Works 
| Best Independent Classical Album
| 
|-

References

External links
 Official Web Site of Amir Farid: .
 Official Web Site of Benaud Trio: .
 Amir Farid playing Prokofiev's Toccata in D minor, Op. 11, recorded in January 2006: (Audio).
 Benaud Trio at work: (Multimedia).
 Benaud Trio's live recordings: (Audio).

Australian people of Iranian descent
Musicians from Melbourne
University of Melbourne alumni
Australian classical pianists
Australian accompanists
Male classical pianists
Iranian pianists
Living people
21st-century classical pianists
Year of birth missing (living people)
21st-century Australian male musicians
21st-century Australian musicians